Scieropepla is a genus of moths in the family Oecophoridae.

Species
Scieropepla acrates Meyrick, 1890
Scieropepla argoloma Lower, 1897
Scieropepla byblinopa Meyrick, 1925  (from Madagascar)
Scieropepla ceramochroa (Turner, 1919)
Scieropepla gibeauxella Viette, 1986   (from Madagascar)
Scieropepla liophanes Meyrick, 1890
Scieropepla megadelpha Lower, 1899
Scieropepla minetorum 	Viette, 1987  (from Madagascar)
Scieropepla monoides Turner, 1906
Scieropepla nephelocentra Meyrick, 1933  (from Madagascar)
Scieropepla obfuscata Meyrick, 1921
Scieropepla orthosema (Lower, 1893)
Scieropepla oxyptera Meyrick, 1890
Scieropepla photinodes (Lower, 1897)
Scieropepla peyrierasella Viette, 1986  (from Madagascar)
Scieropepla polioleuca (Turner, 1919) 
Scieropepla polyxesta Meyrick, 1890
Scieropepla ptilosticta Meyrick, 1915
Scieropepla reversella (Walker, 1864)
Scieropepla rimata Meyrick, 1890
Scieropepla serica (Turner, 1944)
Scieropepla serina Meyrick, 1890
Scieropepla trinervis (Meyrick, 1904)
Scieropepla typhicola Meyrick, 1886

References

Xyloryctinae
Moth genera